Madhyamvarg: The Middle Class (Marathi: मध्यमवर्ग - द मिड्डल क्लास) is a 2014 Marathi film starring Siddharth Jadhav and Ravi Kishan in lead roles. The film is a story about the fight of middle-class people against the bad things in the society. The film marks the debut of Bhojpuri actor Ravi Kishan in Marathi Film Industry.

Plot
The story revolves around a Police Inspector (Siddharth Jadhav) and a journalist (Ravi Kishan) and his family.
It tells the fight of middle-class people against injustice and bad things.

Cast

 Siddharth Jadhav as Inspector Vijay Raut
 Ravi Kishan as Yashwant,  Journalist
 Anant Jog as Minister
 Raj Khatri as Chandan, Minister's Brother
 Nayana Apte
 Sujata Joshi
 Kashmira Kulkarni as Priya
 Hemangi Kaaj
 Kishore Nandalaskar
 Vasant Anjarlekar
 Ramesh Vani
 Anil Gawas
 Tanwi Gouri Mehta as Tanu 
 Allan Fernandes as Manu
 Dr. Dilip Potnis as Chief Editor

Release
The film was released on 12 December 2014 all over Maharashtra. First Look Teaser of the film was released on 13 November 2014 on YouTube. Official Trailer was launched on 27 November 2014. The film clashed with three other Marathi films viz. Love Factor, Mismatch, and Premasathi Coming Suun.

Soundtrack
The music was composed by Gunvant Sen, with lyrics penned by Babasaheb Saudagar, Savta Gavali and Harry Fernandes.

References

 { http://marathimoviemarketing.com/movies/205/Madhyamvarg }

External links
 
 
 
 

2014 films
2010s Marathi-language films